The Welsh Refugee Council is a sister organisation to the Refugee Council and Scottish Refugee Council, and works to help asylum seekers and refugees in Wales.

About 

The Welsh Refugee Council (WRC) is a Wales-based charity committed to protecting the rights of asylum seekers and refugees (RASs) in Wales. For over 28 years, the organisations have been providing advice, information and practical support to asylum seekers and refugees in Wales as they navigate their way through the UK immigration system and transition into their new life in Wales. The organisation speaks out and support those fleeing persecution, conflict, and various forms of injustice and abuse at our offices in Cardiff, Wrexham, Swansea and Newport and works in partnership with Refugee Council, Scottish Refugee Council and the Northern Refugee Centre.

Work 

Advice and support for Asylum Seekers through the Asylum Rights Programme: 
 ensuring that people seeking asylum know their rights and have support, where and when needed, to claim them.
 ensuring that professionals working with people seeking asylum understand the needs of the people they are supporting, as well as their role in contributing to a Wales where rights are enjoyed.
 informing and influencing public understanding about the right to asylum and the benefits of welcoming people in need to Wales. 
 specialist para-legal advice to women asylum seekers on violence against women and girls encouraging them to talk through their experiences with a skilled professional who listens and guide where appropriate and where possible, use their experiences to help strengthen their asylum claim.
 weekly play sessions for asylum-seeking children and their families in Cardiff and Newport with regular outings and day trips in collaboration with sector organisations and arts and crafts groups.

Advice and support for Refugees through the Move on Project to help with 
 preventing homelessness and tenancy support
 housing after being moved from asylum accommodation support
 access to benefits
 rights and entitlements of refugees
 ensuring that individuals have the correct documentation to facilitate the transition from asylum seeker to refugee
 access to employment, healthcare and education
 family reunion

History  
In January 2011, the UK Border Agency announced funding cuts for the Welsh Refugee Council, along with other refugee agencies across the country. It is thought that the One Stop Service, which provides advice to asylum seekers and refugees in Wales could face cuts of 62%. Whilst, the Welsh Refugee Council welcomes the decision by the UK Minister of Immigration, Damien Green, to extend funding until early 2013, it remains anxious over the potential impact of spending cuts on the services it offers vulnerable people in urgent need of aid and assistance.

In its response to planned cutbacks, the Welsh Refugee Council issued a joint statement with its counterparts in England and Scotland: "Savage cuts to the refugee charity sector will force people who have already fled torture, conflict and persecution in their own countries to suffer even further while seeking safety in the UK."

References 

Refugee aid organisations in the United Kingdom
Charities based in Wales
Human rights organisations based in the United Kingdom
Organizations established in 1990
1990 establishments in Wales
Refugee aid organizations in Europe